"Dahil Sa'yo" (English: "Because of You") is a single by Filipino singer Iñigo Pascual from his self-titled debut album. The song was released by Star Music on October 7, 2016 and was heard first on MOR 101.9 For Life!. Its lyric video was uploaded on YouTube on the same date the song was released while its official music video premiered on myx on December 3, 2016 same date when it was uploaded on YouTube.

It was the first number one song on Billboard Philippines' then-new Philippine Top 20 chart, the music industry standard record chart in the Philippines for local singles.

It is also the most viewed OPM video on YouTube beating "Ikaw" by Yeng Constantino by 73.6 million views.

Track listing

Credits and personnel
Credits adapted from YouTube.

 Composer: Inigo Pascual
 Additional Rap Lyrics: Gabriel Tagadtad
 Arrangement: Theo Martel
 Vocal Arrangement: Inigo Pascual, KidWolf
 Mixed by: KidWolf
 Tracking Engineer: Dan Tanedo at Bellhaus Studios

Music charts
The song became the first number-one song of Billboard Philippines' Philippine Top 20 and stayed on top for nine weeks before it was dethroned by the song "Two Less Lonely People in the World" by KZ Tandingan on the week of August 14. As a result, it ranked No. 1 on the Billboard Year End Philippine Top 20 Chart. The song debuted at number 21 on the Philippine Hot 100 and finally reached the top ten in its eighth week of its chart run.

Charts

References

2016 songs
2016 singles
Iñigo Pascual songs
Tagalog-language songs